Gleason Fournier (born September 8, 1991) is a Canadian professional ice hockey player, who is currently playing for the Fehérvár AV19 of the ICE Hockey League (ICEHL).

Playing career
Prior to the 2009 Draft, Fournier played for the Rimouski Océanic of the QMJHL from 2007–2011. Fournier was drafted 90th overall by the Detroit Red Wings in the 2009 NHL Entry Draft.

 On November 29, 2010, the Detroit Red Wings signed Fournier to a three-year entry-level contract.

After completing four years with Rimouski Oceanic, Fournier headed to the Toledo Walleye of the ECHL for one year before finally making it to the Grand Rapids Griffins of the AHL for the 2011–2012 season.

At the conclusion of his entry-level contract with the Red Wings, Fournier was released as a free agent and signed a one-year contract with ECHL club, the Orlando Solar Bears on July 29, 2014. Fournier featured in 26 games with the Solar Bears in the 2014–15 season, before he was dealt to the Florida Everblades on January 29, 2015.

On September 30, 2015, prior to the 2015–16 season, Fournier was traded by the Everblades to the Alaska Aces in exchange for Corey Syvret.

Career statistics

Regular season and playoffs

International

Awards and honours

References

External links

1991 births
Living people
Alaska Aces (ECHL) players
Bolzano HC players
Canadian ice hockey defencemen
Cardiff Devils players
Detroit Red Wings draft picks
Fehérvár AV19 players
Florida Everblades players
Grand Rapids Griffins players
Ice hockey people from Quebec
Orlando Solar Bears (ECHL) players
People from Rimouski
Quebec Amateur Athletic Association players
Rimouski Océanic players
Toledo Walleye players
Canadian expatriate ice hockey players in the United States
Canadian expatriate ice hockey players in Wales
Canadian expatriate ice hockey players in Italy
Canadian expatriate ice hockey players in Hungary